King Ling may refer to:

King Ling College, a secondary school in Tseung Kwan O, Hong Kong
King Ling of Zhou (died 545 BC)
King Ling of Chu (died 529 BC)

See also 
Duke Ling (disambiguation)